David Lloyd is a sportscaster for ESPN. He appeared on the Coast to Coast SportsCenter Monday through Friday with Cari Champion. Lloyd is a native of Westport, Connecticut. He has a bachelor's degree in international relations from Colgate University after graduating in 1983.

After an internship at WMAZ in Macon, Georgia, he anchored sportscasts at KTXL in Sacramento, California; WCIV in Charleston, South Carolina; and KGTV in San Diego, California. He joined ESPN in October 1997.

References

External links
David Lloyd ESPN Bio
 

Living people
American television sports announcers
ESPN people
People from Westport, Connecticut
Colgate University alumni
Sportswriters from New York (state)
Place of birth missing (living people)
Year of birth missing (living people)